The Pikes Peak Auto Hill Climb Educational Museum (PPAHCEM) is an American non-profit 501 (C)(3) organization and serves to promote and develop educational awareness of advancements in motorsports technology and automotive engineering while maintaining and preserving the history of the Pikes Peak International Hill Climb (PPIHC).

The PPIHC operates as the PPAHEM to organize the annual motorsports event.

501(c)(3) organizations
Automobile museums in Colorado
Pikes Peak